Jie Shan is a Chinese-American scientist who is Professor of Physics and Head of Graduate Studies at Cornell University. Her research considers the advanced characterization of two dimensional materials. She was elected Fellow of the American Physical Society in 2013.

Early life and education 
Shan grew up in Zhejiang.  At school she liked mathematics and chemistry. She earned her undergraduate diploma at Moscow State University. She moved to Columbia University for graduate studies, where she worked with Tony Heinz on optical spectroscopy, and developed a table-top coherent terahertz technology.

Research and career 

In 2002, Shan joined Case Western Reserve University as an assistant professor in the physics department. She joined Pennsylvania State University in 2014, where she was promoted to professor. She moved to Cornell University in 2018. Shan studies the optoelectronic properties of single-layer materials. She is particularly interested in Molybdenum disulfide (MoS2) and graphene. She develops linear and non linear spectroscopies and advanced microscopies to understand their steady-state and dynamic phenomena.

Awards and honors 
 2010 Scialog Award for Science Advancement
 2013 Fellow of the American Physical Society
 2021 Mildred Dresselhaus Prize

Selected publications

Personal life 
Shan runs a joint research group with her husband Kin Fai Mak.

References 

Living people
Physicists from Zhejiang
American condensed matter physicists
Moscow State University alumni
Columbia University alumni
Cornell University faculty
Case Western Reserve University faculty
Pennsylvania State University faculty
Fellows of the American Physical Society
Chinese emigrants to the United States
Year of birth missing (living people)